Iceland competed at the 1948 Summer Olympics in London, England. The country was represented by 1 man in Art competitions, 11 men in athletics and 5 men and 3 women in swimming.

Results by event

Art competitions

 Ásgeir Bjarnþórsson (Mixed painting)

Athletics

Men
Track & road events

Field events

Combined events – Decathlon

Swimming

Men

Women

References

External links
Official Olympic Reports

Nations at the 1948 Summer Olympics
1948
Summer Olympics